Matthieu Verschuère (born 8 February 1972) is a French former professional footballer who played as a midfielder.

Honours
Zulte Waregem
Belgian Cup: 2005–06

References

External links
 
 
 

1972 births
Living people
Sportspeople from Beauvais
French footballers
Footballers from Hauts-de-France
Association football midfielders
Ligue 1 players
Ligue 2 players
Belgian Pro League players
AS Beauvais Oise players
LB Châteauroux players
CS Sedan Ardennes players
K.A.A. Gent players
S.V. Zulte Waregem players
Expatriate footballers in Belgium
French expatriate sportspeople in Belgium
French expatriate footballers